Ken Panfil (September 16, 1930 –  April 28, 2002) was an American football tackle who played seven seasons in the National Football League (NFL) with  Los Angeles Rams and Chicago/St. Louis Cardinals

References

1930 births
2002 deaths
American football offensive linemen
Chicago Cardinals players
Los Angeles Rams players
Purdue Boilermakers football players
St. Louis Cardinals (football) players
Eastern Conference Pro Bowl players
Players of American football from Chicago